The 26th European Inline Speed Skating Championships were held in Geisingen, Germany from July 28 to August 3, 2014. Organized by European Confederation of Roller Skating.

Participating nations
19 nations entered the competition.

Medallists

Senior Medal Table

References

Roller skating competitions
2014 in roller sports
2014 in German sport
2010s in Baden-Württemberg